Filospermoidea is an order within the phylum Gnathostomulida. Filospermoids are generally longer than gnathostomulids in the order Bursovaginoidea, and have an elongate rostrum. It lives in North America, off the coasts of the southern United States and the Caribbean, primarily in the Gulf of Mexico, as well as in southeastern Denmark.

Classification 
The order Filospermoidea contains 29 species in 2 families and 3 genera.

 Family Haplognathiidae
 Genus Haplognathia
 Haplognathia asymmetrica
 Haplognathia belizensis
 Haplognathia filum (sometimes in Pterognathia)
 Haplognathia gubbarnorum (sometimes in Pterognathia)
 Haplognathia lunulifera (sometimes in Pterognathia)
 Haplognathia rosea (sometimes in Pterognathia)
 Haplognathia ruberrima (sometimes in Pterognathia)
 Haplognathia rubromaculata (sometimes in Pterognathia)
 Haplognathia rufa
 Haplognathia simplex (sometimes in Pterognathia)
 Family Pterognathiidae
 Genus Cosmognathia
 Cosmognathia aquila
 Cosmognathia arcus
 Cosmognathia bastillae
 Cosmognathia manubrium
 Genus Pterognathia
 Pterognathia alcicornis
 Pterognathia atrox
 Pterognathia crocodilus
 Pterognathia ctenifera
 Pterognathia hawaiiensis
 Pterognathia grandis
 Pterognathia meixneri
 Pterognathia portobello
 Pterognathia pygmaea
 Pterognathia sica
 Pterognathia sorex
 Pterognathia swedmarki
 Pterognathia tuatara
 Pterognathia ugera
 Pterognathia vilii

References 

Gnathostomulida
Marine animals
Invertebrates of North America